Yangon Central railway station, also known as Yangon Central Station, is the largest railway station in Myanmar. It is located within downtown Yangon, and serves as the gateway to Myanmar Railways'  rail network whose reach covers Upper Myanmar (Naypyidaw, Mandalay, Shwebo), upcountry (Myitkyina), Shan hills (Taunggyi, Kalaw), and the Taninthayi coast (Mawlamyine, Ye).

The station was first built in 1877 by the British, and was later rebuilt in 1911. However, the station was destroyed by the retreating British in 1943 from advancing Japanese forces. The current station building was designed by U Tin in traditional Burmese architectural style, making prominent use of indigenous tiered roofs called pyatthat, and was completed on 5 June 1954. Yangon Central railway station has been designated a landmark building since 1996.

History

1877–1954

Yangon Central railway station was first built in 1877 by the British to support Burma's first railway line, from Yangon to Pyay. The station was located on the southern side of the railway compound on the upper block of Phayre Street (now Pansodan Street) in the downtown area. The building was designed in the British Victorian style and the access roads were bordered by grassy lawns. The beauty of the property prompted locals to praise the new structure as the Fairy Station.
The station became a favorite target for Japanese bombers during World War II. In 1943 it was destroyed by British forces retreating to India.

The station was rebuilt following the war according to a design based on Burmese traditional architectural styles, drawn by engineer Hla Thwin. To the north were grass lawns, gardens and wide access lanes. The new design was approved by the Railway Authority on 7 May 1946. Construction was started in January 1947 by engineer Sithu U Tin and completed in May 1954 at a total cost of K4.75 million. The opening ceremony of the new Yangon Central railway station was held on 5 June 1954.

The structure is listed on the Yangon City Heritage List.

1954–present

In December 2007, the Yangon city government announced a master plan that would have resulted in Yangon Central being relocated to a satellite town, East Dagon,  from downtown Yangon at an unspecified date; this did not come to fruition.

Railway lines
The following lines pass through or terminate at Yangon Central:
Yangon Circular Railway
Yangon–Mandalay railway
Yangon–Mawlamyaing railway
Yangon–Bagan railway
Yangon–Aunglan–Bagan railway
Yangon–Pyay railway

Homeless people
It is home of many homeless people who made the railway terminal as their permanent residence.

References

External links
Official website

Railway stations in Yangon
Railway stations opened in 1877
Transport infrastructure completed in 1954
1877 establishments in Burma